Adam Langer (born 1967) is an American author best known for his novel Crossing California, which was published in 2004.

Biography
Langer grew up in the West Rogers Park neighborhood of Chicago, where he attended Daniel Boone Elementary School. He attended Evanston Township High School from 1980–1984 and graduated from Vassar College in 1988. Returning to Chicago, he worked for a little over a decade as an editor, nonfiction author, playwright, theater director, and film producer. In 2000, he won a fellowship to Columbia University's National Arts Journalism Program and remained in New York as a senior editor of Book Magazine until it folded in 2003. He had a weekly column in The Book Standard.

In August 2012, he was named Arts Editor of The Jewish Daily Forward.

Works

Novels
 Crossing California (2004)
 The Washington Story (2005)
 Ellington Boulevard (2008)
 My Father's Bonus March (2009)
 The Thieves of Manhattan (2010)
 The Salinger Contract (2013)
 Cyclorama'' (2022)

References

External links 
 Adam Langer's home page
 Adam Langer Biography at Literary Agency
 Adam Langer Collection, 1984-2011 - Chicago Public Library

21st-century American novelists
American male novelists
20th-century American dramatists and playwrights
Writers from Chicago
1967 births
Living people
Jewish American novelists
Jewish American dramatists and playwrights
Vassar College alumni
American male dramatists and playwrights
20th-century American male writers
21st-century American male writers
Novelists from Illinois
21st-century American Jews